24 Timers Service is the title of the first album by Norwegian rock'n'roll band Vazelina Bilopphøggers. The band won a record contract at the National Rock Championships in 1980 and released the album in autumn of the same year. The single "Gi meg fri ikveld"/"Bilopphøggerboogie" was released before the album, and both songs did well on the Norsktoppen. The album was the only one on which Bjørn Berg and Torbjørn Nicolaysen appeared together.

Track listing
 "Gi meg fri ikveld" – Ya Ya (Lee Dorsey/Lewis/Robinson/Levy/Eldar Vågan)
 "Aagot Stang" – I Got Stung (J. Schroeder/Hill/Jan Paulsen)
 "Kjærlighet i Brøttet" – Wasted Days and Wasted Nights (Freddy Fender/Wayne Duncan/Torbjørn Nicolaysen)
 "Opal min" – Am I Blues (Akst/Clarke/Vågan)
 "Rock Billy Boogie" – Rock Billy Boogie (John Burnette/Dorsey Burnette/Hawkins/Mortimer, Vågan)
 "Bilde ta deg" – A Picture of You (Oakman/Beveridge, Vågan)
 "Fotsoppdænsen" (Vågan, after Ingebrigt Davik)
 "Vazelina medley" – Lonesome Train / That's Alright Mama (Glen T. Moore/Milton Subotsky/Arthur Crudup/ Vågan/I. Holst Jakobsen)
 "Skinnmagre høner" – Bony Moronie (Lawrence E. Williams/Vågan)
 "Balkongen" – Sittin' In The Balcony  (John D. Loudermilk, Vågan)
 "Hembrent i kvæll" – Heartache Tonight (Don Henley/Glenn Frey/Bob Seger/JD Souther/Vågan)
 "Bilopphøgger boogie" (Vågan)
 "Lån meg tenger" – Love Me Tender (Elvis Presley/Vera Matson/Vågan)

Personnel

Vazelina Bilopphøggers 
Eldar Vågan: guitar
Arnulf Paulsen: drums
Torbjørn "Nick" Nicolaysen: bass guitar
Bjørn Berg: vocals

Others 
Jan Einar Johnsen and Bjørn Bogetvedt: choir (under the name Vrakpant)
Lasse Hafreager: piano

1980 debut albums
Vazelina Bilopphøggers albums